Arisaema section Pistillata is a section of the genus Arisaema.

Description
Plants in this section have paradioecious tubers with one to two 3 foliate  or pedately multifoliolate leaves.

Distribution
Plants from this section are found in East Asia with one disjunct population in North America.

Species
Arisaema section Pistillata comprises the following species:

References

Plant sections